The 2007 Utah Blaze season was the second season for the arena football franchise. They look to make the playoffs after finishing 2006 with a 7–9 record.  They went 8–8 record and qualified for the playoffs.

Schedule

Playoff schedule

Roster
(As of 2007-03-12)

Coaching
Danny White entered his second season as the head coach of the Blaze.

Stats

Offense

Quarterback

Running backs

Wide receivers

Touchdowns

Defense

Special teams

Kick return

Kicking

*Traded, released, or deceased

Playoff Stats

Offense

Quarterback

Running backs

Wide receivers

Special teams

Kick return

Kicking

Regular season

Week 1: vs New Orleans VooDoo

Scoring Summary:

1st Quarter:

2nd Quarter:

3rd Quarter:

4th Quarter:

Attendance:

Week 2: at Arizona Rattlers

Scoring Summary:

1st Quarter:

2nd Quarter:

3rd Quarter:

4th Quarter:

Attendance:

Week 3: at Nashville Kats

Scoring Summary:

1st Quarter:

2nd Quarter:

3rd Quarter:

4th Quarter:

Attendance:

Week 4: vs Grand Rapids Rampage

Scoring Summary:

1st Quarter:

2nd Quarter:

3rd Quarter:

4th Quarter:

Attendance: 12684

Week 5: at Las Vegas Gladiators

Scoring Summary:

1st Quarter:

2nd Quarter:

3rd Quarter:

4th Quarter:

Attendance:

Week 6: at Austin Wranglers

Scoring Summary:

1st Quarter:

2nd Quarter:

3rd Quarter:

4th Quarter:

Attendance:

Week 7: vs Los Angeles Avengers

Scoring Summary:

1st Quarter:

2nd Quarter:

3rd Quarter:

4th Quarter:

Attendance:

Week 8: vs Arizona Rattlers

Scoring Summary:

1st Quarter:

2nd Quarter:

3rd Quarter:

4th Quarter:

Attendance:

Week 9: at San Jose SaberCats

Scoring Summary:

1st Quarter:

2nd Quarter:

3rd Quarter:

4th Quarter:

Attendance:

Week 10: vs Dallas Desperados

Scoring Summary:

1st Quarter:

2nd Quarter:

3rd Quarter:

4th Quarter:

Attendance:

Week 11: at Kansas City Brigade

Scoring Summary:

1st Quarter:

2nd Quarter:

3rd Quarter:

4th Quarter:

Attendance:

Week 12: vs Las Vegas Gladiators

Scoring Summary:

1st Quarter:

2nd Quarter:

3rd Quarter:

4th Quarter:

Attendance:

Week 13: at Orlando Predators

Scoring Summary:

1st Quarter:

2nd Quarter:

3rd Quarter:

4th Quarter:

Attendance:

Week 14: vs Colorado Crush

Scoring Summary:

1st Quarter:

2nd Quarter:

3rd Quarter:

4th Quarter:

Attendance:

Week 15: vs San Jose SaberCats

Scoring Summary:

1st Quarter:

2nd Quarter:

3rd Quarter:

4th Quarter:

Attendance:

Week 17: at Los Angeles Avengers

Scoring Summary:

1st Quarter:

2nd Quarter:

3rd Quarter:

4th Quarter:

Attendance:

Playoffs

Week 1: vs (4) Los Angeles Avengers

''at Staples Center, Los Angeles, California

Scoring Summary:

1st Quarter:

2nd Quarter:

3rd Quarter:

4th Quarter:

Attendance: 13,066

Offensive player of the game: Sonny Cumbie (LA)
Defensive player of the game: Silas Demary (LA)
Ironman of the game: Josh Jeffries (LA)

References

External links

Utah Blaze
Utah Blaze seasons
Utah